The A. V. Sveshnikov State Academic Russian Choir is one of the principal choirs of Russia, founded in 1936 by Alexandr Sveshnikov as the choir of the USSR All-Union Radio with Sveshnikov as permanent director from 1941. The choir was renamed in his honour after his death.

Conductors
 Nikolai Danilin (1936-1939)
 Vladimir Vinogradov (1939 - 1941)
 Alexandr Sveshnikov (1941-1980)
 Igor Agafonnikov (1980–1987)
 Vladimir Minin (1987–1990)
 Evgeniy Tytyanko (1991-1995)
 Igor Raevskiy (1995-2007)
 Boris Tevlin (2008-2012)
 Evgeny Volkov (2012-)

Selected recordings
 Rachmaninov All night vigil 1965
 Russian Folk Songs

References

Russian choirs
Musical groups established in 1936